Refused Are Fucking Dead is a 2006 documentary about the Swedish hardcore punk band Refused and the then-last year of their career. The film was directed by the band's guitarist, Kristofer Steen. It includes live performances of "Spectre", "Life Support Addiction", "Circlepit", "New Noise", and "Rather Be Dead."

The DVD includes two of Refused's music videos ("Rather Be Dead" and "New Noise") as well as live performances of all the songs on The Shape of Punk to Come (save for "The Apollo Programme Was a Hoax" and "Protest Song '68") as bonus features.

The film shares its name with one of the band's songs on The Shape of Punk to Come and is a reference to a song titled "Born Against Are Fucking Dead" by the New York hardcore band Born Against.

Reception 
The film received mostly positive reviews. Review aggregator Rotten Tomatoes reports that 82% of 265 user ratings have given the film a positive review, with a rating average of 3.8 out of 5.

References

External links 
Burning Heart Records page on the film

2006 documentary films
2006 films
Documentary films about punk music and musicians
Refused
Swedish documentary films
2000s Swedish-language films
2000s Swedish films